This page lists all described species of the spider family Trochanteriidae accepted by the World Spider Catalog :

D

Doliomalus

Doliomalus Simon, 1897
 D. cimicoides (Nicolet, 1849) (type) — Chile

H

Hemicloea

Hemicloea Thorell, 1870
 H. affinis L. Koch, 1875 — Australia (New South Wales)
 H. crocotila Simon, 1908 — Australia (Western Australia)
 H. limbata L. Koch, 1875 — Australia (New South Wales)
 H. michaelseni Simon, 1908 — Australia (Western Australia)
 H. murina L. Koch, 1875 — Australia (Queensland)
 H. pacifica Berland, 1924 — New Caledonia (Loyalty Is.)
 H. plumea L. Koch, 1875 — Australia (Queensland, New South Wales, Lord Howe Is.)
 H. rogenhoferi L. Koch, 1875 — Australia (Queensland, New South Wales). Introduced to New Zealand
 H. semiplumosa Simon, 1908 — Australia (Western Australia)
 H. sublimbata Simon, 1908 — Australia (Western Australia)
 H. sundevalli Thorell, 1870 (type) — Australia (Queensland, New South Wales), New Zealand
 H. tasmani Dalmas, 1917 — Australia (Tasmania)
 H. tenera L. Koch, 1876 — Australia (Queensland, New South Wales)

P

Plator

Plator Simon, 1880
 P. bowo Zhu, Tang, Zhang & Song, 2006 — China
 P. cyclicus Lin & Li, 2020 — China
 P. dazhonghua Lin & Li, 2020 — China
 P. hanyikani Lin & Li, 2020 — China
 P. himalayaensis Tikader & Gajbe, 1976 — India
 P. indicus Simon, 1897 — India
 P. insolens Simon, 1880 (type) — China
 P. kamurai Lin & Li, 2020 — China
 P. kashmirensis Tikader & Gajbe, 1973 — India
 P. nipponicus (Kishida, 1914) — China, Korea, Japan
 P. pandeae Tikader, 1969 — India, China
 P. pennatus Platnick, 1976 — China
 P. qiului Lin & Li, 2020 — China
 P. serratus Lin & Zhu, 2016 — China
 P. solanensis Tikader & Gajbe, 1976 — India
 P. yunlong Zhu, Tang, Zhang & Song, 2006 — China

Platyoides

Platyoides O. Pickard-Cambridge, 1891
 P. alpha Lawrence, 1928 — Angola, Namibia, South Africa
 P. costeri Tucker, 1923 — South Africa
 P. fitzsimonsi Lawrence, 1938 — Namibia
 P. grandidieri Simon, 1903 — Kenya, Madagascar, Seychelles (Aldabra), Réunion
 P. leppanae Pocock, 1902 — Mozambique, South Africa
 P. mailaka Platnick, 1985 — Madagascar
 P. pictus Pocock, 1902 — South Africa
 P. pirie Platnick, 1985 — South Africa
 P. pusillus Pocock, 1898 — Tanzania, Zimbabwe, South Africa
 P. quinquedentatus Purcell, 1907 — South Africa
 P. ravina Andriamalala & Ubick, 2007 — Madagascar
 P. rossi Platnick, 1985 — South Africa
 P. vao Andriamalala & Ubick, 2007 — Madagascar
 P. velonus Platnick, 1985 — Madagascar
 P. venturus Platnick, 1985 — Canary Is.
 P. walteri (Karsch, 1887) (type) — East, Southern Africa

T

† Thereola

† Thereola Petrunkevitch, 1955
 † T. petiolata Koch and Berendt, 1854 
 † T. pubescens Menge, 1854

Trochanteria

Trochanteria Karsch, 1878
 T. gomezi Canals, 1933 — Argentina, Paraguay, Brazil
 T. ranuncula Karsch, 1878 (type) — Brazil
 T. rugosa Mello-Leitão, 1938 — Argentina

V

Vectius

Vectius Simon, 1897
 V. niger (Simon, 1880) (type) — Brazil, Paraguay, Argentina

† Veterator

† Veterator Petrunkevitch, 1963 - Trochanteriinae
 † V. angustus Wunderlich, 1988 
 † V. ascutum Wunderlich, 1988 
 † V. extinctus Petrunkevitch, 1963 
 † V. incompletus Wunderlich, 1982 
 † V. longipes Wunderlich, 1988 
 † V. loricatus Wunderlich, 1988 
 † V. porrectus Wunderlich, 1988 
 † V. viduus Wunderlich, 1988

References

Trochanteriidae